The men's triple jump event at the 2006 Commonwealth Games was held on March 25.

Results

References
Results

Triple
2006